European Professional Club Rugby (EPCR) is the governing body and organiser of the two major club rugby union tournaments: the Heineken Champions Cup and the EPCR Challenge Cup. A third tournament, the European Rugby Challenge Cup Qualifying Competition was introduced as a qualification competition for clubs from minor nations to enter the Challenge Cup. EPCR shared control of this tournament with Rugby Europe, the international federation for rugby union in Europe, and with the Italian Rugby Federation (FIR). The tournament was discontinued after the 2018/19 season.

The organisation was established in 2014 in Neuchâtel, Switzerland and is now headquartered in Lausanne. Switzerland was chosen so as not to have the headquarters in any of the seven participating countries.

EPCR has nine stakeholders – the six tier 1 unions whose national teams play in the Six Nations Championship, and the club bodies that represent the English, French, Scottish, Irish, Italian, Welsh and South African clubs in their respective leagues.

The inaugural competitions were held in the 2014/15 season.

History
Prior to 2014, the pan-European club competitions - the Heineken Cup, and European Challenge Cup - were organised and run by European Rugby Cup Ltd. (ERC). ERC was created in 1995, following the advent of professionalism, by the then Five Nations Committee.

In 2012, Premiership Rugby and LNR, on behalf of the English and French clubs respectively, notified ERC that they would be withdrawing from the accord governing the competition, being dissatisfied with the organisation of the competition and the distribution of funding. Premiership Rugby subsequently refused to join any new agreement in which ERC remained organisers of European rugby tournaments.

On April 10, 2014 it was announced that the nine stakeholders with an interest in continuing major European club competition had come to an agreement for new competitions. Under the new agreement, ERC was wound up, and a new body, European Professional Club Rugby (EPCR), would be created to organise three new competitions, European Rugby Champions Cup, the European Rugby Challenge Cup, and the third tier Qualifying Competition, beginning with the 2014/15 season.

Shortly after the establishment of EPCR, it was announced that the running of the inaugural 2014/15 tournament was to be handled in conjunction with ERC, the organisation it had been meant to replace, to facilitate a smooth transition. This was despite the latter having been described by chairman of Premiership Rugby, Quentin Smith, as "no longer fit for purpose". This was described as "something of an about-turn" by The Daily Telegraph.

Since the 2015/16 season, EPCR staff have been running the competitions from their base in Switzerland. In 2017 the qualifying competition was reconstituted as a fully fledged third competition, the European Rugby Continental Shield.

EPCR governance

Board of Directors
EPCR is managed through a 9-person Board of Directors, which represents all stakeholders, and includes an independent chairman. The nine shareholders, by country, are listed below:
 England - Rugby Football Union, Premiership Rugby Limited
 France - Ligue Nationale de Rugby
 Italy - Federazione Italiana Rugby
 Ireland, Italy, Scotland, South Africa, Wales - United Rugby Championship

The EPCR independent chairman is Dominic McKay, who took over as interim chairman when Simon Halliday stepped down in October 2021. McKay was confirmed as permanent chairman in May 2022.

Executive committee
There is also an executive committee, in charge of commercial matters relating to the tournaments, and preparations for Board meetings. This committee includes the Independent Chairman, Director-General, and three voting representatives, one representing each of the major European domestic leagues, the Top 14, the English Premiership and Pro14. Representation by English and French clubs on the three-person executive committee represents an increase in voting power for these two leagues as compared to the previous European Rugby Cup.

Jacques Pineau became the interim Director General of EPCR when the tournament began, and was responsible for the day-to-day operations of EPCR. On 29 April 2015, it was announced that Swiss national Vincent Gaillard had been appointed the Director General, and would work with Pineau until 1 July 2015, when he would officially take on the role. Anthony Lepage was appointed to the role of CEO on an interim basis in October 2021 when Gaillard stepped down.

Revenue
Revenues generated by EPCR tournaments are divided in three equal parts — one third to Premiership Rugby clubs, one third to LNR clubs, and one third to URC clubs. Under the previous European Rugby Cup, the Irish, Welsh, Scottish and Italian clubs had received 52% of revenues, while the English and French clubs received 48%.

European Player of the Year
The European Player Award was introduced by ERC in 2010, as part of their ERC15 awards, created to recognise the outstanding contributors of the first 15 years of European rugby. The first recipient of the award, considered the best player of the previous 15 years, was Munster Rugby's Ronan O'Gara. Following the award, and beginning with the 2010-11 Heineken Cup season, ERC began presenting a Player of the Year Award annually.

EPCR continued the award after taking over the running of European competitions, and the first EPCR European Player of the Year Award was presented following the 2014-15 European Rugby Champions Cup season.

The most recent player to be awarded the accolade was Alex Goode in 2019.

Since 2017, the Player of the Year has been awarded The Anthony Foley Memorial Trophy, commissioned in tribute to Anthony Foley, the former Munster head-coach.

ERC European Player of the Year (2010 - 2014)
 2010: Ronan O'Gara (Munster Rugby) (Awarded for the previous 15 seasons)
 2011: Seán O'Brien (Leinster Rugby)
 2012: Rob Kearney (Leinster Rugby)
 2013: Jonny Wilkinson (Toulon)
 2014: Steffon Armitage (Toulon)

EPCR European Player of the Year (2015 - )
 2015: Nick Abendanon (Clermont)
 2016: Maro Itoje (Saracens)
 2017: Owen Farrell (Saracens)
 2018: Leone Nakarawa (Racing 92)
 2019: Alex Goode (Saracens)
 2020: Sam Simmonds (Exeter Chiefs)
 2021: Antoine Dupont (Toulouse)
 2022: Josh van der Flier (Leinster)

EPCR Elite Awards
The Elite Awards were created by ERC, to celebrate the 10th anniversary season of the Heineken Cup. Introduced to recognise the most prominent teams and players of the competitions, EPCR has since maintained and continued the awards, updating them to include both Heineken Cup and European Rugby Champions Cup appearances.

Teams with 50 or more European Cup appearances

Players with 100 or more European Cup caps

Players with 50 or more European Cup caps
The EPCR Elite Awards recognise any player who has won 50 or more European Cup caps. Given the length of this list, an abridged version recognising players with over 65 caps is included.

The full list can be found here.

Players with 500 or more European Cup points

Players with 25 or more European Cup tries

See also
European Rugby Champions Cup
European Rugby Challenge Cup
European Rugby Continental Shield

References

European Rugby Champions Cup
EPCR Challenge Cup
 
2014 establishments in Europe
International sports bodies based in Switzerland
Companies based in Neuchâtel
2014 establishments in Switzerland